Henri Mondor (20 May 1885, Saint-Cernin, Cantal – 6 April 1962) was a French physician, surgeon, and a historian of French literature and medicine.
 
Mondor was a professor of clinical surgery in Paris and became a member of the French Académie Nationale de Médecine in 1945, The Académie française in 1946 and The Academy of Science in 1961. He is known for his studies of rectal cancer and urgent diagnosis, and Mondor's disease, which is a thrombophlebitis of the superficial veins of the breast and anterior chest wall, is named in his honour. He was also a writer.

References

1885 births
1962 deaths
People from Cantal
French medical writers
20th-century French physicians
French surgeons
Members of the Académie Française
Members of the French Academy of Sciences
Grand Officiers of the Légion d'honneur
Commandeurs of the Ordre des Palmes Académiques
Commandeurs of the Ordre des Arts et des Lettres
20th-century surgeons